This is a list of drowning victims in chronological order. The reasons for drowning are diverse and range from suicide, to accidents or murders.

Antiquity 
Tiberinus Silvius, ninth Latin king of Alba Longa, drowned in the Tiber, which was named after him.
Hippasus of Metapontum, a student of the mathematician Pythagoras, who, by some accounts, was drowned by his fellow Pythagoreans for the imprudence of discovering irrational numbers.
Qu Yuan of China in 278 BC. Committed ritual suicide as a form of protest against the corruption of the era, a sacrifice still commemorated today during the Duan Wu or Dragon Boat Festival.
Pharaoh Ptolemy XIII of Egypt, drowned in the Nile in 47 BC.
Antinous (born circa 111), lover of Roman Emperor Hadrian, drowned in the Nile in 130; the grieving emperor commissioned hundreds of statues of the youth and spread them around the Empire.
Cao E, a Han Dynasty girl venerated for her filial piety. In 143, Cao Xu accidentally fell into the Shun River. in an act of filial piety, she decided to find her father in the river. After five days, she and her father were both found dead in the river from drowning. Eight years later, a temple was built in Shangyu dedicated to the memory of Cao E and her sacrifice for filial piety. The Shun River was renamed Cao'e River in her honor.
Maxentius, Roman Emperor, drowned in the Tiber during the chaos of the Battle of the Milvian Bridge on October 28, 312.
Yuan Zhao, briefly an emperor of the Northern Wei, thrown together with Empress Dowager Hu into the Yellow River to drown
Shabib ibn Yazid al-Shaybani, (697/98), a rebel in Umayyad Caliphate, was defeated by Umayyad Army. As he attempted to escape his Syrian pursuers (the Umayyad army), he drowned in the Dujayl Canal while trying to cross it. This occurred either in early 697 or in 697/98.
Li Bai, Chinese poet, in 762. It is, however, suggested that he died of excessive drinking or mercury poisoning.

Middle Ages 
William Adelin (born 1103) and his half-sister Matilda FitzEdith, countess of Perches (born circa 1090), children of King Henry I of England, drowned in the Channel on 25 November 1120 in the White Ship wreck.
Kilij Arslan died trying to escape across the Khabur river, having lost the battle that took place near the river.
 Empress Zhu is believed to have committed suicide by drowning herself in 1127 after the Jingkang Incident because she failed to avoid being a victim of sexual abuse.
 Taira no Koremori is believed to have committed suicide on May 10, 1184 after defeated at the Battle of Kurikara.
Emperor Antoku, Taira no Tokiko, Tomomori, Noritsune and many other members of the Taira clan committed suicide on April 25, 1185 after defeated at the Battle of Dan-no-ura.
Friedrich I Barbarossa, Duke of Swabia and Holy Roman Emperor, drowned in the Göks River (Cilicia) on 6 June 1190 during the Third Crusade, leaving an unstable alliance between Richard I of England and Philip II of France.
Henry of Antioch, Henry of Poitiers or Henri de Poitiers, drowned at sea on 18 June/27 June/28 June 1276, son of Bohemund IV of Antioch and first wife Plaisance Embriaco de Giblet
King Magnus IV of Sweden and Norway (as Magnus VII), 1316 – 1374.
Zhao Bing and Lu Xiufu committed suicide after defeated at Battle of Yamen, and Southern Song fell, on March 19, 1279. 
Saint John of Nepomuk, martyred by drowning in 1393.

Renaissance 
Henry Holland, 3rd Duke of Exeter, Constable of the Tower of London, 1430 – 1475
George, Duke of Clarence (born 1449), executed for treason against his brother king Edward IV of England on 1478, by drowning in a barrel of Malmsey wine; or so the legend says, because modern assessments favour the traditional decapitation instead
Bartolomeu Dias, a Portuguese explorer who sailed around the Cape of Good Hope. Drowned not far from the Cape of Good Hope in 1500
King Louis II of Hungary in the Csele Brook, on escape from the catastrophic Battle of Mohács (1526). Heavy cavalry armor impeded his ability to swim.
Felix Manz, co-founder of the Swiss Anabaptists, was drowned in 1527 in the Limmat in Zürich by the Zürich Reformed state church
Robert Parsons, English composer, fell into the then swollen River Trent at Newark-on-Trent in Nottinghamshire and was drowned. 
Francisco Rodrigues Lobo (b. 1580), a Portuguese poet and writer of Sephardi Jewish origin, drowned on 4 November 1621
Alexander Whitaker, the "Apostle of Virginia" drowned while fording the James River in Virginia. He was the first English-speaking Clergyman in the New World.

18th Century 
John William Friso of Orange-Nassau, stadholder of the Low Countries, in 1711
Miguel de Bragança (b. 1699), bastard son of King Peter II of Portugal, in the Tagus River on 13 January 1724
Peter Artedi, a disciple of Linnaeus, considered the father of Ichthyology, fell by accident in a channel of Amsterdam in 1735
172 passengers of shipwrecked vessel Le Saint Géran at Île D'Ambre off the coast of Isle de France (Mauritius) on 18 August 1744.

19th Century 
Percy Bysshe Shelley, influential English Romantic poet, in a sudden storm while sailing off Livorno on 8 July 1822.
Charles Clement Johnston, U.S. Representative from Virginia, drowned in the Potomac River near Alexandria, Virginia in 1832.
Lucas Barrett, English naturalist and geologist in 1862.
Gonçalves Dias, a Brazilian Romantic poet, playwright, ethnographer, lawyer and linguist, in 1864.
Constantine W. Buckley, former Speaker of the Texas House of Representatives, drowned in the Brazos River near Columbia, Texas on 19 December 1865.
William Collinson Sawyer 1st Bishop of Grafton and Armidale died on Sunday, 15 March, 1868 when the boat he was travelling in sank on the Clarence River.
Richard Kirwan, English cricketer and Anglican clergyman, drowned while bathing in the sea off Sidmouth on 2 September 1872.
Julius Krohn (b. 1835), founder of the scientific study of folklore, and influential journalist, author and translator. Ethnically German but active in Finland. Drowned in a freak sailing accident in 1888.

Twentieth century

1900s 
Consort Zhen (born 1876), consort of Guangxu Emperor, thrown into a well by Empress Dowager Cixi, August 15, 1900.
Isadore Rush (born ?), American actress. Drowned off the beach at San Diego, Hotel Del Coronado November 1904.
Grace Brown (born 1886), American garment industry worker. She drowned in New York's Big Moose Lake on June 11, 1906, after she fell out of a boat being rowed by her boyfriend, Chester Gillette, nephew of her employer. Witnesses said Gillette had struck her on the head with a tennis racket before she went into the water; he claimed she had jumped out. After a murder trial that drew national attention, Gillette was convicted and sentenced to death; he was executed two years later. The case inspired Theodore Dreiser's novel An American Tragedy. 
Ernst Schultz (born 1879), Danish sprinter. Drowned while swimming in Roskilde Fjord, 20 June 1906.

1910s 
Sir W. S. Gilbert (b. 1836), British humorist, librettist of the Gilbert and Sullivan operas, drowned on 29 May 1911 while going to the rescue of two other swimmers in the lake at his home. He may have died from a heart attack rather than by drowning.
Michel Tamarati (born 1858), a Georgian Catholic priest and historian, died while trying to rescue a drowning man in a stormy sea near Santa Marinella, Italy, on September 16, 1911. 
John Jacob Astor IV (born 1864) drowned in the Titanic disaster in 1912.
Benjamin Guggenheim (born 1865) drowned in the Titanic disaster in 1912.
Isidor Straus and wife Ida Straus, drowned in the Titanic disaster.
Grigori Rasputin (died 1916), Russian mystic and Imperial adviser. The aristocratic faction tried to kill him using several methods, including, after poison, several gunshots; this is believed to be the main cause of his death, but after his body was thrown in the Neva River (and later recovered), many tend to believe that drowning was the final cause of his death. For others, attributing death to drowning means adding to a legend.
Enrique Granados drowned after jumping out of a lifeboat to rescue his wife following the torpedoing of their ship by the German navy during World War I in 1916.
Tom Thomson, Canadian painter who died in a canoeing accident in Algonquin Provincial Park in 1917.

1920s 
William Wilton (born 1865), Scottish football manager (Rangers F.C.), drowned in a boating accident at Gourock, Scotland in 1920.
Little Lord Fauntleroy (murder victim), an unidentified child found in Waukesha, Wisconsin on March 8, 1921. He had been hit in the head with a blunt instrument and was thrown into a quarry, which resulted in his death.
Sacadura Cabral, died on 15 November 1924 after his airplane disappeared over the English Channel, along with his co-pilot Mechanical Corporal José Correia. As no bodies were found, it is not known whether they actually drowned.

1930s 
J. W. H. T. Douglas, (1882–1930), cricketer, died unsuccessfully trying to rescue his father after a collision at sea.
Starr Faithfull (1906–1931), American socialite, drowned near Long Beach, New York in June 1931; whether her death was homicide, suicide or accident was never determined. 
Bertie Johnston, Australian politician, drowned at Black Rock, Victoria in 1932.
Hart Crane, poet; suicide in the Caribbean in April 1932.
 Eugene James (1913–1933), Kentucky Derby-winning American jockey drowned in Lake Michigan while swimming at Chicago's Oak Street Beach.
Oskar Kumpu (1889–1935), Finnish Olympic wrestler and Red Army officer, drowned while swimming in the Olonka River in the Soviet Union.
Jiro Sato (1908–1934), Japanese tennis player, committed suicide in the Strait of Malacca on April 5, 1934.
James Murray, (1901–1936), actor, found drowned in the Hudson River, possible suicide.
Alfonsina Storni, (1892–1935), Argentine poet, committed suicide in Mar del Plata, Argentina.

1940s 
Virginia Woolf (born 1882), British writer, committed suicide on 28 March 1941.
Osamu Dazai (born 1909), Japanese writer, committed shinjū in the Tamagawa Aqueduct on June 13, 1948.

1950s 
Arky Vaughan (born 1912), baseball Hall of Famer, drowned after falling from his fishing boat on 30 August 1952.
Susan Martin (1945–1958) and Virginia Martin (1947–1958) died by drowning in the Columbia River in unexplained circumstances when they, along with their mother, father, and older sister, disappeared in December 1958.

1960s
David Kenyon Webster, of the 101st Airborne (Band of Brothers) was lost at sea, September 6, 1961, while studying sharks.  Presumed drowned.
Klara Dan von Neumann (born 1911), pioneer in computer science, drowned on 10 November 1963 in La Jolla, California
Johnny Burnette, pop singer known for hits such as "You're Sixteen" drowned after a boating accident on August 14, 1964.
On 9 July 1964: drowning of 8 members of para-military branch Special Mobile Force (SMF) at Bras D’Eau, Poste Lafayette in Mauritius (Sergeant Nadal, constables Célestin, Sandoo, Bazire, Dahary, Dornford, Virasamy and civilian Hervé Couronne. 
Lao She (born 1899), Chinese novelist and dramatist. Experienced mistreatment when the Cultural Revolution began in 1966, committed suicide by drowning himself in Beijing's Taiping Lake on 24 August 1966.
Prince Frederick of Prussia (born 1911), died in 1966 at Reinhartshausen, Germany after drowning in the Rhine.
Eric Fleming, actor best known for his role in the CBS series Rawhide, drowned on 28 September 1966, in a remote river in Peru's back country while filming the made-for-TV movie "Selva Alta" ("High Jungle") for MGM.
Harold Holt, serving Prime Minister of Australia, presumed to have drowned on 17 December 1967.
Brian Jones (born 1942), original guitarist of The Rolling Stones, drowned in Hartfield, Sussex, England, in his own swimming pool on 3 July 1969. Classified as "death by misadventure".
Mary Jo Kopechne (born 1940), drowned in Ted Kennedy's Oldsmobile Delta 88 in a car accident off of Chappaquiddick Island in mid-July 1969.

1970s 
Albert Ayler, jazz musician, suspected suicide November 1970.
George Duncan (born 1930), Australian law lecturer, drowned in Adelaide's River Torrens after being thrown in by a group of men believed to have been police officers charged with enforcing vice laws, particularly gay cruising on the riverbanks. No suspects have ever been identified in the case, but outrage over it led South Australia to become the first Australian state to fully decriminalize homosexuality three years later.
Cengaver Katrancı (born 1964), a Turkish boy, who lived in West Berlin. He is one of the youngest victims of the Berlin Wall's existence. Drowned in the Spree on October 30, 1972.
István Kertész, orchestral conductor, accident, 16 April 1973.
Josef Mengele (born 1911), war criminal and leader of the Nazi human experimentation programme, drowned while swimming off the Brazilian coast in 1979.
Horatio Strother (born 1930), American historian and educator who accidentally drowned while swimming in Hidden Lake in Haddam, Connecticut, in 1974.

1980s 
John Crabbe Cunningham (born 1927), Scottish climber, mountain instructor and member of the Creag Dhu mountaineering club, drowned at South Stack, Anglesey, Wales in January 1980, when attempting to rescue a female pupil who fell into the sea while Coasteering
Natalie Wood (born 1938), actress, drowned in a yachting accident in 1981 off of Santa Catalina Island; the accident raised several suspicions and murder was considered and the case was reopened in 2011 and is now categorized as suspicious with husband Robert Wagner named as a person of interest.
Joe Delaney (born 1958), Running back for the Kansas City Chiefs, accidentally drowned in 1983 while trying to save three children who were screaming for help.
Dennis Wilson (born 1944), one of the members of the Beach Boys, drowned in 1983 at Marina del Rey, California, while diving after drinking.
Jessica Savitch (born 1947), NBC and PBS news broadcaster and reporter, drowned in 1983 when the car in which she was riding went off the road during a heavy rainstorm into a canal, sank upside down in mud and filled with water.
Grégory Villemin (born 1980), French child, was found drowned, bound and gagged in France's Vologne River  from his home in Lépanges-sur-Vologne on October 16, 1984. It was later found that the water in his lungs did not match the river, suggesting he had been killed elsewhere. The ensuing homicide investigation and trials captivated the country; no one has been convicted in the case.
Hans Neij (born 1921), a Swedish Air Force major general serving as defence attaché in Washington, D.C. and Ottawa drowned during a holiday stay at Fort Walton Beach, Florida on 24 April 1985.
Fernando Pereira, Dutch photographer drowned when French agents sank the Greenpeace ship Rainbow Warrior, July 10, 1985.
Carol Wayne, American actress who drowned under mysterious circumstances in Manzanillo, Mexico in 1985.
Uwe Barschel, German politician who was found dead under mysterious circumstances on 11 October 1987 when his clothed body was discovered in a full bathtub at Hotel Beau-Rivage in Geneva.
Jerry Anderson, former NFL football player who drowned while saving a boy who had fallen into a flooded creek in 1989.

1990s 
Jim Hodder, (born 1947), American drummer who drowned in his pool in 1990.
Robert Maxwell, newspaper magnate, disappeared from his yacht under mysterious circumstances in 1991, body later recovered off the coast of Tenerife, Canary Islands.
Will Sinnott, bass player and keyboardist for The Shamen, who drowned while swimming in the Canary Islands in 1991.
Kiyoshi Nishimura, Japanese film maker, committed suicide on November 17, 1993.
Tom Mees, longtime sportscaster for ESPN, drowned while trying to rescue his 4-year-old daughter in a neighbor's swimming pool, in 1996. The daughter survived.
David Chan Yuk-cheung (Chinese: 陈毓祥, born 1950), a leader of Baodiao movement in Hong Kong, drowned in the sea during a protest in 1996.
Jeff Buckley (born 1966), singer-songwriter, drowned in the Wolf River in Memphis, Tennessee in 1997.
Mae Boren Axton, songwriter known as "The Queen Mother of Nashville" and mother of singer Hoyt Axton, drowned in her hot tub at her home in Hendersonville, Tennessee, in 1997, after an apparent heart attack.
Nerine Kidd Shatner  (Born July 13, 1959) actress/model and the third wife of William Shatner drowned while swimming alone in the couple's pool.

21st century

2000s 
Linda Andersen (born 1959), forcibly drowned in her bathtub by her two daughters in Mississauga, Ontario, on January 18, 2003.
Riley Fox (born 2001), American child, was found drowned in a creek near Wilmington, Illinois on June 6, 2004, shortly after she had been reported missing. Her father was initially suspected of killing her and spent eight months in jail before evidence cleared him and charges were dropped; he would later successfully sue the local sheriff's office for violations of his civil rights. A paroled convict living nearby was later convicted after his own confession and sentenced to life without parole. 
Spalding Gray (born 1941), monologuist and actor (Swimming to Cambodia), drowned in a suspected suicide in New York City's East River in 2004.
Geetha Angara (born 1961), drowned in a water tank at a treatment plant where she worked as a chemist in Totowa, New Jersey, on February 8, 2005. Although the possibility has been raised that the drowning was accidental, police are investigating the death as a homicide, either by intent or negligence, but  no suspects had been identified.
 Tom Rogers (born 1918), creator of Charlie the Tuna for StarKist, drowned in his son's swimming pool while swimming alone, in Charlottesville, VA on June 24, 2005.  He was 87 years old.
Édouard Michelin (born 1963), French businessman, drowned while fishing near the island of Sein in northwest France, in 2006.
Barbara Precht, pulled from the Ohio River on 29 November 2006. Her body was not identified until November 2014. She died from drowning due to unknown circumstances.
Rafael Donato (born 1938), distinguished Filipino educator and university president, accidentally drowned off the coast of Morong, Bataan, in the Philippines in 2006.
Marquise Hill (born 1982), Defensive End for the New England Patriots, accidentally drowned in Lake Pontchartrain in New Orleans after a jet ski accident on 27 May 2007.
Jeremy Blake (born 1971), American digital artist and painter, drowned on or around July 17, 2007 in the Atlantic Ocean in an apparent suicide (although some suspect he was murdered by Scientologists) after being reported missing off Rockaway Beach, Queens, New York. His body was found in the water off Sea Girt, New Jersey on July 22, 2007.
Seth Tobias (born 1963), American hedge fund manager, drowned on September 4, 2007 while under the influence of drugs and alcohol in his swimming pool in Jupiter, Florida
Kari Blackburn (born 1954), BBC World Service executive, drowned (suicide) at sea at Felixstowe, Suffolk, England in 2007.
Katoucha Niane (born 1960), French model, drowned in the Seine in 2008.
Pit Martin (born 1943), Canadian ice hockey player, drowned after his snowmobile fell through thin ice in Quebec in 2008.
 Ophélie Bretnacher, a French student, drowned in the Danube between December 2008 and February 2009.

2010s 
Dawn Brancheau, SeaWorld trainer, killed during a killer whale show and suffered a blunt trauma on February 24, 2010.
Toshiharu Ikeda, Japanese film director and screenwriter, committed suicide in December 2010.
Marie-France Pisier, French actress, found dead in her swimming pool April 2011.
Nandana, the 8-year-old daughter of Indian singer K. S. Chithra, drowned after falling into a swimming pool in Dubai, April 2011.
Whitney Houston, American singer, found dead in her bathtub following a barbiturate overdose, February 2012.
Rodney King, American construction worker, victim of police brutality, found dead in his swimming pool with alcohol, marijuana and cocaine in his system, June 2012.
Elisa Lam (born 1991), Canadian tourist in Los Angeles, found in the water tank atop the hotel where she was staying on February 19, 2013.
Flash floods in Port Louis, Mauritius on 30 March 2013 cause drowning of 11 adults Sylvia Wright (46-year-old), Jeffrey Wright (18-year-old), Amrish Teewary (24-year-old), Trishul Teewary (19-year-old), Keshav Ramdhary (29-year-old), Vikesh Khoosye (25-year-old), Vincent Lai (age 45), Rabindranath Bhobany (age 52), Stevenson Henriette (age 32), Retnon Sithanen (age 36), and Christabel Moorghen in tunnels, waterways and carpark.
David Bird, American journalist, found in a river near his home 14 months after he was last seen alive in early 2014.
Alan Kurdi (born 2012), Syrian child, drowned in the Mediterranean off the Turkish coast on September 2, 2015, while his family was trying to enter Greece and seek refugee status from their country's civil war. A photograph of Kurdi's body lying lifeless on the shore sparked global outrage over the plight of Syrian refugees.
Santiago Maldonado, drowned while trying to cross río Chubut while escaping from the federal law enforcement.
Sally Brampton, English journalist, writer and magazine editor, committed suicide by walking into the sea at St Leonards on 10 May 2016.
Maria Ladenburger, died of drowning in the German river Dreisam on October, 16th 2016 after being sexually assaulted.
Vladimir Cvijan, died of drowning in the Danube in Belgrade, Serbia on 5 January 2018. His death was kept hidden from the public for 3 years, until it was revealed in March 2021.
Dolores O’Riordan, Irish musician and vocalist for the Cranberries died of drowning caused by alcohol poisoning in her bathtub at the London Hilton on Park Lane hotel on 15 January 2018.
Sridevi, veteran Indian actress, died aged 54 on 24 February 2018 after drowning in the bathtub of her room in a hotel in Dubai, where she had gone to attend a marriage. Initially, the cause of her death was known as a heart attack, but it was later confirmed to be drowning. It is believed that she was under the influence of alcohol when she died.
Eric Geboers, age 55, a 5-time Belgian world champion motocross racer, died on 6 May 2018, while trying to save his drowning dog.
Ray Emery, Canadian ice hockey goaltender, drowned in Hamilton Harbour on July 15, 2018.
Florijana Ismaili, Swiss Footballer, drowned in Lake Como in July 2019.
Chan Yin-lam (born 2004), drowned in the ocean off Hong Kong September 19, 2019. Her death was ruled a suicide; conspiracy theories circulated that she had actually been killed by the police over her participation in the ongoing protests.

2020s 
 On 8 July 2020, Alex Pullin (also known as 'Chumpy'), an Australian Olympic snowboarder, drowned after a spearfishing accident at Palm Beach, Gold Coast in Queensland, Australia.
 Also on 8 July 2020, Naya Rivera drowned in Lake Piru, Ventura County, California, after saving her son. After being declared a missing person and a subsequent search and rescue mission, her body was found on 13 July 2020.
He was rescued by divers and flown  by air ambulance to Ullevål University Hospital in Oslo, though he was unable to be resuscitated and died on the 27th.

References

 
Drowning